Annmary Brown Memorial is an art museum, library and mausoleum at Brown University.  It is located at 21 Brown Street in Providence, Rhode Island. It is one of six libraries comprising the University Library system. Before merging with the university in 1948, the museum was founded as an independent collection by General Rush Hawkins and his wife, Annmary Brown. The Hawkinses are interred in a crypt at the building.  The building was constructed in 1903 by architect Norman Isham. Today, the museum features a wide array of art from around the world.

The building housed a well known collection of 450 incunabula for many years. In 1990, the collection was moved to the John Hay Library.

Visiting
The museum is normally open on Monday through Friday from 1:00 to 5:00 pm during the academic year, Labor Day through Memorial Day.

See also
List of museums in Rhode Island
List of libraries in Rhode Island

References

External links

Brown University libraries
Brown University buildings
Museums established in 1903
Museums in Providence, Rhode Island
University museums in Rhode Island
Art museums and galleries in Rhode Island